Sparkle may refer to:

 Sparkle (catamaran), a catamaran designed by Angus Primrose
 Sparkle (drink), a lemon-flavored soft drink
 Sparkle, a brand of paper towels owned by Georgia-Pacific
 Sparkle Plenty, a character in the Dick Tracy comic strip
 Sparkle (❇), a form of dingbat

Film
 Sparkle (1976 film), an American film released by Warner Bros
 Sparkle (2007 film), an English film starring Stockard Channing
 Sparkle (2012 film), a remake of the original 1976 film

Music
Artists
 Sparkle Moore (born 1936), rockabilly singer
 Sparkle (singer) (born 1975), R&B singer

Albums
 Sparkle (Sparkle album), 1998
 Sparkle (Aretha Franklin album), 1976; the soundtrack to the above 1976 film
 Sparkle: Original Motion Picture Soundtrack, 2012; the soundtrack to the above 2012 film

Extended Plays
 Sparkle (Marion EP), 1998

Songs
 "Sparkle", a song by Diana Ross from the 1979 album The Boss
 "Sparkle", a song by My Life Story from the 1997 album The Golden Mile
 "Sparkle", a song by Phish from the 1993 album Rift
 "Sparkle", a song by Radwimps from the 2016 album Your Name.
 "Sparkle", a song by Sophie Ellis-Bextor from the 2001 album Read My Lips
 "Rule/Sparkle", a 2009 song by Ayumi Hamasaki
 "Tweet Dream / Sparkle", a 2012 song by Fairies

Computing
 Sparkle (software), a free software library designed to simplify software updates in macOS
 Microsoft Expression Blend, a code-named Sparkle, software application
 SPARKLE Computer Co., Ltd., a Taiwanese maker of graphic cards

Video games 
Sparkle 2 Evo, a 2011 video game
Sparkle 3 Genesis, a 2015 video game

Organizations
 Sparkle (charity), a trans rights organisation formed in 2005
 Sparkle (talent agency), a talent agency of GMA Network
 Telecom Italia Sparkle, a subsidiary of Telecom Italia

See also
 Spark (disambiguation)
 Sparkler (disambiguation)
 Sparkling (disambiguation)
 
 
 SPARQL, an RDF query language